is a public college in the city of Gifu, Gifu Prefecture, Japan, founded in 1946. Its abbreviated name is Gijotan (岐女短).

Academic departments
Department of English
Department of International Culture Studies
Department of Food and Nutrition
Department of Apparel and Interior Design

External links
 Official website

Educational institutions established in 1946
Japanese junior colleges
Buildings and structures in Gifu
Universities and colleges in Gifu Prefecture
1946 establishments in Japan
Women's universities and colleges in Japan